Phyllonorycter incurvata is a moth of the family Gracillariidae. It is known from Karnataka, India.

The larvae feed on Strobilanthes species, including Strobilanthes callosus. They probably mine the leaves of their host plant.

References

incurvata
Moths of Asia
Moths described in 1916